Lady Audley's Secret is a 1920 British silent drama film directed by Jack Denton and starring Margaret Bannerman, Manning Haynes and Betty Farquhar. It was an adaptation of the 1862 novel Lady Audley's Secret by Mary Elizabeth Braddon.

Plot
Sir Michael Audley marries a younger woman. She throws her first husband down a well, is blackmailed by a gardener who knows her secret, and tries to burn him to death. But something goes wrong.

Cast
 Margaret Bannerman - Lady Audley 
 Manning Haynes - Robert Audley 
 Betty Farquhar - Alysia Audley 
 Randolph McLeod - Captain George Talboys 
 Wallace Bosco - Luke Marks 
 Berenice Melford - Phoebe 
 Hubert Willis - Sir Michael Audley 
 William Burchill - Captain Malden 
 Ida Millais - Mrs Plowson

References

External links

1920 films
British silent feature films
Films directed by Jack Denton
1920 drama films
British drama films
Ideal Film Company films
British black-and-white films
1920s English-language films
1920s British films
Silent drama films